William Heath (died 1607), of Bath, Somerset, was an English politician.

He was a Member (MP) of the Parliament of England for Bath in 1597 and 1601. He was Mayor of Bath in 1595–6 and 1597–8.

References

Year of birth missing
1607 deaths
Mayors of Bath, Somerset
English MPs 1597–1598
English MPs 1601